Roger Jeffrey Miner (April 14, 1934 – February 18, 2012) was a United States circuit judge of the United States Court of Appeals for the Second Circuit and a United States district judge of the United States District Court for the Northern District of New York.

Education and career

Miner was born on April 14, 1934, in Hudson, New York. He received a Bachelor of Laws from New York Law School in 1956. He received a Bachelor of Science from State University of New York in 1977. He served as a Captain in the United States Army Judge Advocate General's Corps from 1956 to 1959. He was in private practice of law in Hudson from 1959 to 1975. He was corporation counsel for the City of Hudson, New York from 1961 to 1964. He was an assistant district attorney of Columbia County, New York in 1964. He was the district attorney of Columbia County from 1968 to 1975. He was an adjunct associate professor, Columbia-Greene Community College from 1974 to 1979. He was a justice of the New York State Supreme Court from 1976 to 1981. He was an adjunct professor, New York Law School from 1986 to 1996. He was an adjunct professor of Albany Law School of Union University from 1997 until his death.

Federal judicial service
Miner was nominated by President Ronald Reagan on July 28, 1981, to a seat  on the United States District Court for the Northern District of New York vacated by Judge James Thomas Foley. He was confirmed by the United States Senate on September 25, 1981, and received commission on September 28, 1981. His service was terminated on August 2, 1985, due to elevation to the Second Circuit.

Miner was nominated by President Reagan on June 25, 1985, to the United States Court of Appeals for the Second Circuit, to a new seat created by 98 Stat. 333. He was confirmed by the Senate on July 22, 1985, and received commission the same day. He assumed senior status on January 1, 1997 due to a certified disability, serving in that status until his death.

Supreme Court consideration
In 1987 after Robert Bork’s Supreme Court nomination was rejected by the Senate, President Reagan considered appointing Miner. Miner was alongside eventual nominee Anthony Kennedy and Ralph K. Winter Jr. one of three candidates considered acceptable by the Senate’s Democratic majority under the leadership of Joe Biden and Robert Byrd. Miner was, however, opposed by some Senate Republicans, and drew strong opposition from anti-abortion and right-to-work groups, because of his refusal to state his position on abortion. The seat, formerly held by Lewis F. Powell Jr, ultimately went to Kennedy.

Kirsten Gillibrand, the junior Senator from New York, served as his law clerk from 1992-1993.

Notable case
In January 1987 Miner and Jon O. Newman heard Salinger v. Random House, deciding that with unpublished works the right of the copyright owner to control publication took precedence over the right of "fair use". This was interpreted as setting the right of an individual to privacy ahead of the public right to know.

Death

Roger Miner died of heart failure at his Hudson home. He was survived by his wife, Jacqueline, several sons and a brother.

See also

George H. W. Bush Supreme Court candidates
List of Jewish American jurists

References

External links

Archival Collection of Judge Roger J. Miner: 1981-2012
Roger Jeffrey Miner entry at The Political Graveyard

1934 births
2012 deaths
People from Hudson, New York
20th-century American Jews
County district attorneys in New York (state)
Judges of the United States Court of Appeals for the Second Circuit
Judges of the United States District Court for the Northern District of New York
New York Law School alumni
New York Law School faculty
New York (state) lawyers
New York Supreme Court Justices
New York (state) Republicans
United States Army officers
United States court of appeals judges appointed by Ronald Reagan
United States district court judges appointed by Ronald Reagan
20th-century American judges
21st-century American Jews